The River Ems is a much-sluiced,  river of the far west of West Sussex which for its last  delimits eastern Hampshire, before flowing into large, coastal Chichester Harbour.

Source
Over the centuries various cartographers and chroniclers have suggested a variety of sources for the Ems.

From source to the sea
Along the county-limits part, of its west bank, is the old town portion of Emsworth that contains mainly pre-1900-built buildings.
The Ems flows south west through Walderton as a broad-catchment winterbourne. It runs past:
the hamlet that includes well-preserved Lordington House
Racton Monument which has nearby in Racton hamlet the church for Lordington
A copse, Ractonpark Dell
the village of Westbourne, has the westmost section of the Ems, in Sussex. Westbourne receives a year-round brook from the north and that descends under the railway at Emsworth (in Hampshire), becomes tidal, drains Brook Meadow to Peter and Slipper Mill Ponds from where it discharges into the sea. At lower tides it helps forms at the head of Emsworth Channel in the harbour; its last few metres enable access to Emworth Marina, the other former tidal mill pond.

Etymology
It is sometimes thought that the town of Emsworth derives its name from that of the River Ems,  this is not correct as before the 16th Century  the stream was originally called the Bourne. The river was renamed by the 16th century chronicler Raphael Holinshed. Many of the towns and villages that the River Ems runs through or past still have Bourne as a suffix. e.g.:Westbourne.

Notes

References

Citations
 
 
 
 
 

Rivers of Hampshire
Rivers of West Sussex